Syed Meesaq Rizvi (born January 23, 1962) was a Pakistani sprinter and middle-distance runner who represented the country at two Summer Olympic Games, in Los Angeles in 1984 and in Seoul in 1988, without winning any medals.

Biography
Rizvi was educated at the Habib Public School in Karachi and the Government College in Lahore and  qualified as a medical doctor specializing in sports medicine. He has also served with the Pakistan Cricket Board (PCB) on their medical commission and has been in the news due to his work regarding fitness problems faced by bowler Shoaib Akhtar. Rizvi now runs a Fitness centre in Lahore.

Rizvi came to the limelight when he earned a bronze medal in the 800 meters event at the National Athletics Championship in Peshawar in 1982. One year later, at the same competition in Hyderabad he finished second in the same event and was then again third in Faisalabad in 1984.

At the 1984 Summer Olympics Rizvi ran the 400 meters in 49.58 seconds in his heat, finishing seventh and last. In his 800 meters heat, he ended with a time of 1:51.29 minutes which placed him fifth out of seven runners. At the first South Asian Federation (SAF) Games in Kathmandu that year, he competed in the 1,500 meters race but finished sixth. At the National Athletics Championship in Islamabad in 1985 he was second in the 800 metres and finally won a gold medal in the 400 meters event at the Nationals in Rawalpindi in 1987 with a time of 53.32 seconds.

Rizvi won a silver medal as part of Pakistan's 4x400 meters relay quartet at the SAF Games in Dhaka in 1985. He ran it in 1:49.60 minutes but still got a silver medal in 800 meters in an International Meet in Delhi 1987. He represented Pakistan at the 2nd IAAF World Championships in Athletics in Rome in 1987, but did not start in his first round heat 6 in the 800 meters event.

At the 1988 Summer Olympics Rizvi took part only in the 800 metres race. He ended sixth out of eight in his heat with a time of 1:51.58. Overall, he was ranked 50th out of a total of 70 participants.

References
Syed Meesaq Rizvi's profile at Sports Reference.com

1962 births
Living people
Muhajir people
Pakistani male middle-distance runners
Pakistani male sprinters
Olympic athletes of Pakistan
Athletes (track and field) at the 1984 Summer Olympics
Athletes (track and field) at the 1988 Summer Olympics
Place of birth missing (living people)
Athletes from Punjab, Pakistan
Sportspeople from Lahore